NGC 4457 is an intermediate spiral galaxy located about 55 million light-years away in the constellation of Virgo. It is also classified as a LINER galaxy, a class of active galaxy defined by their spectral line emissions. NGC 4457 Is inclined by about 33°. It was discovered by astronomer William Herschel on February 23, 1784. Despite being listed in the Virgo Cluster Catalog as VCC 1145, NGC 4457 is a member of the Virgo II Groups which form an extension of the Virgo cluster.

NGC 4457 may have had a recent minor merger with another galaxy.

On July 1 2020, an astronomical transient was discovered in NGC 4457 by  astronomer Kiochi Itagaki and confirmed by ASAS-SN. Spectroscopic classification determined the object to be a Type Ia Supernova, SN 2020nvb.

Physical characteristics
NGC 4457 has a broad oval zone containing an inner spiral which is defined mainly by two fairly open arms. There is a well-defined outer ring that is completely detached from the inner regions of the galaxy.

Truncated disk
NGC 4457 has a severely reduced amount of star-formation in its disk while its inner regions have a normalized rate of massive star formation. This may have been caused by a recent interaction of the gas in the galaxy with the gas in the surrounding Virgo Cluster, causing the gas to be stripped away in an effect known as ram-pressure stripping.

See also 
 List of NGC objects (4001–5000)
 Messier 90
 Comet Galaxy - a distant galaxy in the cluster Abell 2667 which is experiencing ram-pressure stripping as well

References

External links 

 Sasmirala page on NGC 4457

Intermediate spiral galaxies
LINER galaxies
Virgo (constellation)
4457
41101
7609
Astronomical objects discovered in 1784